Your Mamma Won't Like Me is the third studio album by Suzi Quatro. Released in May 1975 by record label Rak in most countries, in the US the album was released through Arista Records, the label that had recently succeeded Bell Records which distributed Quatro's first two previous releases in that country. The LP marked a change in the hard rock sound from the singer's previous albums Suzi Quatro and Quatro, instead displaying a more funk-oriented rock sound.

The title track reached No. 31 on the UK singles chart in February 1975. The album's second single, "I Bit off More Than I Could Chew", also reached the charts, peaking at 54 in the UK charts. "Michael" also had limited promotion, being released as a single in some territories, including Australia where the song reached the top 100. The album reached the charts in several territories, reaching the top 50 in Germany, Norway and New Zealand, as well as making an appearance in the US charts, peaking at 146.

The album includes a cover of Little Willie John's "Fever". This was the last LP to include Alistair Mackenzie as keyboard player, with Mike Deacon replacing him thereafter. In 2012, the album was re-issued and digitally remastered by 7T's Records in the UK, along with her other studio releases. This particular re-issue contains bonus tracks and some rare pictures.

Track listing

Charts

Tour
This is the album Quatro was promoting during her first UK headline tour, "RAK Rocks Britain", where she headlined a nine-date tour with the Arrows and Cozy Powell's Hammer.

The tour dates were as follows:

23 February- The Apollo (Glasgow)

24 February- Newcastle City Hall

25 February- Hard Rock- Manchester

26 February- Preston Guildhall

3 March- Liverpool Stadium

4 March- Sheffield City Hall

5 March- Birmingham Town Hall

6 March- Ipswich Gaumant

8 March- Rainbow Theatre

Personnel
 Suzi Quatro - lead vocals, bass guitar, writer
 Len Tuckey - lead guitar, backing vocals, writer
 Dave Neal - drums, backing vocals
 Alistair Mackenzie - keyboards, backing vocals
 Bud Beadle - saxophone
 Chris Mercer - saxophone
 Mick Eve - saxophone
 Steve Gregory - saxophone
 Ron Carthy - trumpet
 Pete Coleman - engineer
 Mike Chapman - producer, writer
 Nicky Chinn - producer, writer

References

External links

Suzi Quatro albums
Rak Records albums
Albums produced by Mike Chapman
1975 albums